ExerciseTV was an American video-on-demand (VOD) service available to digital cable customers. The network received around eight million views every month.

ExerciseTV workouts ranged from cardio and abs to yoga, pilates and personal training.

History
ExerciseTV was launched in January 2006 by Jake Steinfeld and was a joint venture between him, Comcast, Time Warner Cable, and New Balance. The service was managed by Comcast, with New Balance and Time Warner Cable acting as additional equity partners. It was available in the United States via the digital cable services of Comcast, Time Warner Cable, Cox Communications and Bresnan Communications.

ExerciseTV shut down on December 31, 2011.

References

Comcast
Internet properties established in 2006
Internet properties disestablished in 2011
Joint ventures
Defunct video on demand services
English-language television stations in the United States
2006 establishments in the United States
2011 disestablishments in the United States